Satoshi Kataoka (片岡聡, born August 3, 1958) is a professional Go player.

Biography 
Kataoka became a pro in 1972 at the age of 14. He was promoted to 9 dan in 1988.

Promotion record

Titles & runners-up

External links
GoBase Profile
Nihon Ki-in Profile (Japanese)

1958 births
Living people
Japanese Go players